Eleonore von Schwarzenberg (Eleonore Elisabeth Amalia Magdalena; 20 June 1682 in Mělník – 5 May 1741 in Palais Schwarzenberg, Vienna) was a member of the Princely House of Lobkowicz by birth, and a Princess of Schwarzenberg by marriage.

Biography
Princess Eleonore Elisabeth Amalia Magdalena of Lobkowicz, was a daughter of Prince Ferdinand August of Lobkowicz (1655–1715), the Duke of Sagan, and his second wife, Margravine Maria Anne Wilhelmine of Baden-Baden (1655–1701), daughter of Wilhelm, Margrave of Baden-Baden.

On 6 December 1701 Princess Eleonore married the Austrian Hofmarschall, Adam Franz Karl Eusebius, Hereditary Prince (and later Prince) von Schwarzenberg. Eleonore was considered a cultivated woman, and her and her husband's wealthy and cultured lifestyle was often displayed at court. The marriage produced two children:
 Maria Anna of Schwarzenberg (1706–1755); married Louis George, Margrave of Baden-Baden in 1721.
 Joseph I Adam of Schwarzenberg (1722–1782); married Princess Maria Theresia of Liechtenstein (1721–1753) in 1741.

After 21 years of marriage her husband was killed in a hunting accident on imperial land near Brandýs nad Labem-Stará Boleslav, today in the Czech Republic. Emperor Charles VI fired the deadly shot, and the prince just happened to be in the way. Afterwards, the emperor took Eleonore's son to his court in Vienna, and she was paid a baronial maintenance of 5,000 guldens.

Princess Eleonore died on 5 May 1741 in the Palais Schwarzenberg in Vienna. Franz von Gersdorf, the emperor's physician, requested an autopsy from which the cause of death has been diagnosed as cervical cancer.

Vampirism
The 2007 Austrian documentary The Vampire Princess features Eleonore as the supposed inspiration for Gottfried August Bürger's work Lenore (ballad).

Styles
 20 June 1682 – 6 December 1701: Princess Eleonore of Lobkowicz
 6 December 1701 – 1703: Her Serene Highness The Hereditary Princess of Schwarzenberg
 1703 – 1732: Her Serene Highness The Princess of Schwarzenberg
 1732 – 5 May 1741: Her Serene Highness The Princess Dowager of Schwarzenberg

References

External links

1682 births
1741 deaths
Deaths from cancer in Austria
Deaths from cervical cancer
Lobkowicz family
Eleonore
People from Mělník
Vampirism